This is a list of naval officer designators in the United States Navy. In the United States Navy, all active and reserve component officers are assigned to one of four officer communities, based on their education, training, and assignments: Line Officers (divided into Unrestricted Line or URL, Restricted Line or RL, and Restricted Line Special Duty or RL SD), Staff Corps Officers, Limited Duty Officers (LDO), or Warrant Officers (WO/CWO). Each community is further subdivided by primary occupation. Each occupation is identified by a designator.

Definition
The officer billet designator codes are four-digit numbers used to identify the primary naval specialty qualifications required of the billet incumbent and to administratively categorize officer billets for proper management and identification. They serve as a manpower management tool when used in conjunction with the officer designator codes. These codes are entered in the Manpower Authorizations (OPNAV Form 1000/2) to indicate the categories of officers required for the billets.

The first digit identifies the officer's community.

The second and third digits denote the officer's area of specialization within the line, staff corps, LDO, or warrant officer community.

The final (fourth) digit denotes the officer's current type of commission.

Between fiscal year 1992 and fiscal year 2005, all officers entering the U.S. Navy were awarded a Reserve commission (commissioned as ensigns, USNR). Legislation was signed that all Reserve officers on full-time active duty, previously designated by a "5" in the last digit of the designator, would be converted to a regular Navy commission by the close of fiscal year 2006.

There is no distinction between USN and USNR officers, no matter what the commissioning source. All hold the same ranks, have the same responsibilities and authority, and enjoy the same privileges. As part of the U.S. Navy's Active–Reserve Integration (ARI) initiative that "operationalized" the Navy's Reserve component, the term "U.S. Naval Reserve" was superseded by "U.S. Navy Reserve", and the term USNR was discontinued as a matter of Total Force policy in 2005. All officers in the U.S. Navy now use the term USN with their rank titles.

As used above, Full Time Support (FTS) program officers are reserve officers serving on either fixed or indefinite periods of active duty, while remaining reserve officers, under the authority of 10 USC 12310. The Full Time Support program exists to provide FTS for training, administration, recruiting, organization, and equipping the reserve components.

(1xxx) Line Officers

Fully Warfare Qualified Unrestricted Line (URL) Officers
Unrestricted Line Officers (URL Officers) are commissioned Officers of the Line in the United States Navy, both Regular Navy and Navy Reserve, who are not restricted in the performance of duty, and are qualified to Command at Sea the Navy's warfighting combatant units such as warships, submarines, aviation squadrons, and SEAL Teams. They are also qualified to command the higher echelons of those units, known as "major commands," such as destroyer and submarine squadrons, aviation wings and groups, and special warfare groups. At the Flag Officer level, they also command carrier strike groups, expeditionary strike groups, task forces, and Fleet and Force commands. URL officers are also eligible to command shore installations, facilities and activities directly supporting the Navy's warfare mission.

Non-Warfare Qualified Unrestricted Line (URL) Officers
110X General URL Officer without warfare qualifications (NOTE: Those Fleet Support Officers (FSO) without warfare qualifications were merged into URL officer designator 110X after 2010, after RL SD designator 170X was phased out, per the 2010 NAVPERS 15839I, Manual of Navy Officer Manpower and Personnel Classifications, Vol. 1, Part A).

130X
URL Officer previously qualified Naval Aviator or Naval Flight Officer whose operational flight rating has been terminated for aviation medical or flight performance reasons, or by the individual's personal resignation.

Training Designators For Unrestricted Line Officers

Restricted Line (RL) Officer designators
Officers of the line of the Regular Navy and Navy Reserve who are restricted in the performance of duty by having been designated for aviation duty, engineering duty, aerospace engineering duty, or special duty. RL officers are authorized to command ashore within their particular speciality, but are not eligible for combatant command at sea, which remains strictly within the purview of URL officers.

Restricted Line Special Duty (RL SD) Officers

Training designators For Restricted Line (RL) and Restricted Line Special Duty (RL SD) Officers

([2-5]x0x) Staff Corps Designators
Officers, Regular and Reserve, of all staff corps of the Navy. The eight staff corps (and one Flag Officer) designators are:

(6xxx) Limited Duty Officers 
Officers of the line, or staff, as appropriate by their career field, of the Regular Navy and Navy Reserve appointed for the performance of duty in the broad occupational fields indicated by their former warrant designators or enlisted rating groups.

Limited Duty Line Officers (by Community)

Limited Duty Staff Corps Officers (by Community)

Limited Duty Line Officers (Information Warfare Community)
NOTE: 68XX designators to be assigned to Lieutenant/O-3E and below requirements only. LCDR/O-4 and above billets are assigned the appropriate 18XX designator.

(7xxx) Warrant Officers
Officers of the line, or staff, as appropriate by their career field, of the Regular Navy and Navy Reserve appointed to chief warrant officer for the performance of duty in the technical fields indicated by former enlisted rating groups.

Line Chief Warrant Officers (by Community)

Staff Corps Chief Warrant Officers (by Community)

Line Chief Warrant Officers (Information Warfare Community)

See also
 United States Navy officer rank insignia
 List of United States Navy staff corps
 Uniforms of the United States Navy
 Badges of the United States Navy
 U.S. Navy Midshipman rank insignia can be found in the Midshipman article.
 U.S. Navy Warrant officer rank insignia can be found in the Warrant Officer (United States) article.
 List of United States Navy enlisted warfare designations
 United States Navy enlisted rate insignia
 List of United States Navy ratings
 Navy Enlisted Classification

References

 
United States Navy job titles
Designators list